Aspidosperma polyneuron  is a timber tree native to Brazil. It is common in Atlantic Forest vegetation. In addition, it is useful for beekeeping.

References

External links
 Aspidosperma pyricollum

pyricollum
Trees of Brazil
Endangered plants
Plants described in 1860
Taxa named by Johannes Müller Argoviensis